Winner Takes All is a 2000 Hong Kong comedy film directed by Clifton Ko and featuring an ensemble cast. This film released was to celebrate Chinese New Year.

Plot 
Ferrari (Nicholas Tse), is a young swindler. He has been swindling people for money in many situations. One day, a cop nicknamed 'Stupid' (Karl Maka) is about to catch him swindling. He makes a deal with Ferrari to help him catch Master Swindler Wong (Sam Hui), the world's most notorious swindler who is penning his autobiography of his swindling ways. Ferrari runs into Bastardly Sze (Alec Su) who is stalking a rich woman and taking her pictures.

Paulina Wu (Joey Yung)'s father is one of the victims of the Master Castrator Swindler. So she decides to get her father's money back. On her trip, she runs into Bastardly Sze and Ferrari. The three wants swindle the girl, whom they think is Master Swindler Wong's daughter, Wu Sen Kwan (Ruby Lin).

With Wu Sen-kwan is her so-call assistant, Ching (Annie Wu). Ching and Ferrari once met before. Ferrari and Ching were going out on a date. Ching asked Ferrari wait for her to come, she never did. Later, he learned Ching had swindled him.

The group (Ferrari, Bastardly Sze, and Paulina) are following fake Swindler Wong's daughter to the boat. They have a plan to swindle her money. Ferrari pretends to be a priest. He asks Swindler Wong's daughter to donate $1 million for charity. During that time, Bastardly Sze is falling for Wu Sen-kwan. Paulina is jealous of Wu Sen Kwan because she likes Bastardly Sze. Sze feels bad in swindling Sen Kwan.

Cast 
 Nicholas Tse – Ferrari
 Ruby Lin – Wu Sen-kwan
 Annie Wu – Ching
 Joey Yung – Paulina Wu
 Alec Su – Bastardy Sze
 Raymond Wong – Father Wong
 Karl Maka – Inspector 'Stupid'
 Sam Hui – Master Swindler Wong
 Ricky Hui – Swindler Wong's brother
 Lisa Lui – Mrs. Chin
 Perry Chiu – Girl courted by Ferrari at telephone booth

See also
 List of Hong Kong films

External links
 
 Winner Takes All at LoveHKFilm.com
 Winner Takes All Tokyo Fansite

2000 films
2000 comedy films
Hong Kong slapstick comedy films
2000s Cantonese-language films
Films shot in Singapore
2000s Hong Kong films